was a Japanese statesman, courtier and politician during the Heian period.
He is also known as Teishin-Kō (貞信公) or Ko-ichijō Dono (小一条殿) or Ko-ichijō daijō-daijin.

Career
Tadahira was a kuge (Japanese noble) who is credited with writing and publishing Engishiki.  He is one of the principal editors responsible for the development of the Japanese legal code known as Sandai-kyaku-shiki, sometimes referred to as the Rules and Regulations of the Three Generations.

Tadahira served as regent under Emperor Suzaku who ruled from 930 to 946.

 September 17, 914 (Engi 14, 25th day of the 8th month): Dainagon Tadahira was named udaijin.
 October 16, 930 (Enchō 8, 22nd day of the 9th month): Tadahira was appointed sesshō.
 September 7, 936 (Jōhei 6,  19th day of the 8th month):  He assumed the role of daijō-daijin.
 February 16, 937 (Jōhei 7, 4th day of the 1st month): He presided over the coming of age ceremony of Emperor Suzaku.
 November 29, 941 (Tengyō 4, 8th day of the 11th month):  He became kampaku.

Genealogy
This member of the Fujiwara clan was the son of Mototsune.  Tadahira's brothers were Fujiwara no Tokihira and Fujiwara no Nakahira. Emperor Suzaku and Emperor Murakami where the maternal nephews of Tadahira.

Tadahira took over the head of the Hokke branch of the Fujiwara clan in 909 when his elder brother Tokihira died.

Wives and progeny
He was married to Minamoto no Junshi (源 順子), daughter of Emperor Uda.

They had a son.
 Fujiwara no Saneyori, also known as Ononomiya Dono (小野宮殿). - Kampaku for Emperor Reizei 967–969, and Sesshō for Emperor En'yū 969–970

He was also married to Monamoto no Shōshi (源 昭子), daughter of Minamoto no Yoshiari.

They had several children.
 Morosuke   - Udaijin 947–960, grandfather of Emperor Reizei and Emperor En'yū
 Moroyasu (師保) - priest
 Morouji (師氏) (913–970) - Dainagon 969–970
 Morotada (師尹) (920–969) - Sadaijin 969

Daughters' mothers were unknown. (She might be  Junshi or Shōshi.)
 Kishi (貴子) (904–962) - consort of Crown Prince Yasuakira
 Kanshi (寛子) (906–945) - consort of Imperial Prince Shigeakira

Selected works
In a statistical overview derived from writings by and about Fujiwara no Tadahiro, OCLC/WorldCat encompasses roughly 9 works in 13 publications in 2 languages and 201 library holdings.

 延喜式  (1723)
 延喜式  (1828)
 Teishinkōki: the Year 939 in the Journal of Regent Fujiwara no Tadahira (1956)

Honours
Senior First Rank (September 13, 949; posthumous)

Notes

References

 Brinkley, Frank and Dairoku Kikuchi. (1915). A History of the Japanese People from the Earliest Times to the End of the Meiji Era. New York: Encyclopædia Britannica. OCLC 413099
 Nussbaum, Louis-Frédéric and Käthe Roth. (2005).  Japan encyclopedia. Cambridge: Harvard University Press. ;  OCLC 58053128
 Titsingh, Isaac. (1834). Nihon Ōdai Ichiran; ou,  Annales des empereurs du Japon.  Paris: Royal Asiatic Society, Oriental Translation Fund of Great Britain and Ireland. OCLC 5850691

880 births
949 deaths
Fujiwara clan
Regents of Japan
Japanese poets
People of Heian-period Japan
Hyakunin Isshu poets